John Wilson Danenhower (September 30, 1849 – April 20, 1887) was a United States Navy officer best known for his participation in the Jeannette expedition.

Early life 
Born in Chicago, Danenhower attended local public schools, then accepted appointment to the United States Naval Academy in 1866.

Following this, he was assigned to the Portsmouth surveying party in the North Pacific. In 1875, he was assigned to the U.S. Naval Observatory where he attained the rank of master and then lieutenant in 1879.

Jeannette expedition 
From Smyrna, his petitioned services in the Arctic Jeannette expedition—officially called the United States Arctic Expedition—were accepted and he soon joined Captain George W. De Long at Le Havre, prior to sailing on to the Mare Island Navy Yard, near San Francisco. The ship set sail for the Bering Strait on July 8, 1879. En route, Captain De Long, in a letter to his wife, Emma, praised Danenhower's work ethic.

Danenhower began a school of navigation for the crew while the Jeannette was wedged in an ice pack. Unfortunately, he was ineffective to the expedition and rendered unfit for duty on December 22, 1879, due to a months-long and ever increasingly treatment-resistant eye inflammation caused by syphilis.

Then on June 12, 1881, the ship was crushed by ice. The team was forced to drag their boats and provisions over the ice towards the Siberian coastline. Danenhower, with one eye bandaged and one covered by a dark goggle, complained often about not being allowed to take command of a group of men or lead a task, seemingly oblivious to his incapacitation. De Long was ultimately forced to order him to ride in a sledge due to his failing eyesight and frequent stumbles into crevasses.

They finally found open water and set a course for the Siberian Lena River delta in three separate boats which became separated by gale winds on September 12, 1881. Danenhower's boat, under command of Chief Engineer George W. Melville, reached the eastern Lena River Delta five days later. The crew was rescued by friendly natives. Danenhower set sail for the United States and arrived on May 28, 1882. His published book, Lieutenant Danenhower's Narrative of the Jeannette, graphically describes his experiences.

Later life and death 
For a few years, in ill health, he served as the assistant commander for midshipman training at Annapolis. His health problems centered around his failing eyesight. There, on April 20, 1887, brooding over this incident, he committed suicide.

Family 
He was survived by his wife, Helen Sloan Danenhower and two children, Lieutenant Commander Sloan Danenhower, commander of the Arctic exploration submarine , and Ruth Danenhower Wilson, an author. Danenhower's grandson was writer Sloan Wilson, who wrote The Man in the Gray Flannel Suit and was captain of a U.S. Coast Guard ship in World War II. John Wilson Danenhower was buried at Riverside Cemetery in Oswego County, New York.

References

Footnotes

Sources 

 Guttridge, Leonard. Icebound: The Jeannette Expedition's Quest for the North Pole Annapolis, Md., Naval Institute Press, 1986, .
 Johnson, Allen & Malone, Dumas (ed.'s). Dictionary of American Biography. vol. III. Charles Scribner's Sons, New York, N.Y. 1959.
 Lieutenant John W. Danenhower, at Naval Historical Center.
 Sides, Hampton. In the Kingdom of Ice: The Grand and Terrible Polar Voyage of the USS Jeannette Doubleday, 2014, .

External links 

 
 
 

1849 births
1887 deaths
19th-century American memoirists
American military personnel who committed suicide
American polar explorers
American sailors
Jeannette expedition
People from Annapolis, Maryland
Military personnel from Chicago
Suicides in Maryland
United States Naval Academy alumni
United States Navy officers
1880s suicides